T33 or T-33 may refer to:

 ,  a German warship of World War II
T-33 (Korall), a Soviet minesweeper of World War II
T33 (classification) a category for disability athletics
T-33 Shooting Star a U.S. jet trainer 
T-33 Light Amphibious Tank a Soviet light tank

Similar designations:
Alfa Romeo Tipo 33
London Buses route T33
Sony Cyber-shot DSC-T33, a Sony Cyber-shot camera